Plus Architecture is an Australasian architecture practice, with seven studios across Australia and New Zealand. It was founded in Melbourne in 1997

It has studios in Melbourne, Brisbane, Sydney, Christchurch, Auckland, Perth and the Gold Coast.

The directors are Ian Briggs, Rainer Strunz, Jessica Liew, Amit Julka, Jaimin Atkins, Danny Juric, Rido Pin, Luke Henderson, Glenn Cowdrey, Sarah Townson, Patric Przeradzki and William Schofield.

References

Architecture firms of Australia
Companies based in Melbourne